The Twin Column Tomb is a two-chambered burial tomb dating from Koguryo period. It is located in Nampo, North Korea. It is listed as a National Treasure of North Korea for the painting on the north wall of the back chamber. The tomb was discovered by the Japanese during their occupation of the Korean Peninsula.

At the Korea International War Crimes Tribunal in June 2001, the DPRK alleged that US Forces used the tomb "to lock up and torture our innocent civilians, during which the frescos were ruthlessly destroyed".

The paintings
The plaster walls of the tomb were richly decorated with people riding chariots and horses, as well as a musical band. They have all now but disappeared. A portion of the wall painting showing a horse rider was affixed to the wall in 1913, when the tomb was investigated by the Japanese; it later came to Joseon Government-General Museum and is now in the collection of the National Museum of Korea.

References 

National Treasures of North Korea
Archaeological sites in North Korea
Buildings and structures in Nampo